Oliba may refer to:

 Oliba I of Carcassonne (died 837)
 Oliba Cabreta (c. 920 – 990)
 Abbot Oliba (c. 971 – 1046)